Taint of Madness is a 1995 role-playing game supplement for Call of Cthulhu published by Chaosium.

Contents
Taint of Madness deals with asylums and sanatoriums in detail, lists all the recognized forms of insanity as well as their treatments, and details three fully developed asylums – Bethlehem for the 1890s, Arkham for the 1920s, and Bellevue for the 1990s.

Reception
Dean Evans reviewed Taint of Madness for Arcane magazine, rating it a 6 out of 10 overall. Evans comments that "Taint of Madness is an interesting, thought-provoking book and, like most of the Cthulhu add-ons, is crammed with information. But since most referees prefer to side-step the idle months between scenarios, it's not exactly an essential read."

Reviews
Rollespilsmagasinet Fønix (Danish) (Issue 12 - Mar/Apr 1996)

References

Call of Cthulhu (role-playing game) supplements
Role-playing game supplements introduced in 1995